Stefan Olsson (born 1948/1949) is a Swedish billionaire businessman and Catholic priest, and 24.5% owner of Stena Sphere.

Stefan Olsson is the second son of Sten Allan Olsson, the founder of Stena Sphere. His siblings Dan Olsson owns 51% and Madeleine Olsson Eriksson owns 12.5%.

He is married and lives in London, England.

References

1940s births
Living people
Swedish businesspeople
Swedish billionaires